Pascual Abaj (alternatively written Pascual Ab'aj), also known as Turcaj, Turk'aj, Turuk'aj and Turukaj, is a pre-Columbian Maya idol at Chichicastenango that survived the Spanish conquest of Guatemala and which is still venerated by the local community. It is the best-known example of such an image. The image was badly damaged in the 1950s by members of Catholic Action.

History

After the Spanish conquest, the stone figure is said to have been carried away from a site in the village of Chichicastenango and reset upon the hill so offerings could be made away from the vigilance of the Catholic Church and the Spanish colonists.

Before it was defaced, the statue was described as a grotesque human figure with a large head and high, pointed forehead. It had two circular earspools in line with its mouth; its arms were crossed on its chest, with the fingers extended. A cord was sculpted around its waist, to which was attached the image of an inverted severed human head. An observer in the 1950s noted that the figure appeared to have been buried sometime in the past.

Traditional Maya shamans regularly perform ceremonies at the shrine, by day and night. The statue is set upon a small altar surrounded by offerings, which include pine branches, crosses, flowers, copal resin, and items crafted from stone. The shrine has now become a popular tourist attraction where visitors witness traditional Maya ceremonies.

Location
The statue is set on a small plateau amongst pine forest.

Etymology
Abaj means "stone" in several contemporary highland Maya languages, including Kʼicheʼ and Kaqchikel, while Pascual means "Easter" in Spanish. "King Pascual" has been recorded as the subject of veneration since at least the 19th century. Turcaj (spelled Turk'aj in modern Maya orthography) is the Kʼicheʼ name for the hill upon which the shrine is located.

See also
Maya stelae
Potbelly sculpture

Notes

References

Carmack, Robert M. (2001). Kik'ulmatajem le Kʼicheʼaab': Evolución del Reino Kʼicheʼ (in Spanish). Guatemala: Iximulew. . .
Chládek, Stanislav (2011) Exploring Maya Ritual Caves: Dark Secrets from the Maya Underworld Lanham, Maryland, US: Rowman Altamira. . .
Cook, G. W.; T. A. Offit, T. A.; and R. Taube (2013). "The Dynamics of Contemporary: Maya Religious Tradition: Agency and Structure in Selected Case Studies" in Indigenous Religion and Cultural Performance in the New Maya World. Albuquerque, New Mexico, US: University of New Mexico Press. . .  
Früsorge, Lars (2015) "Sowing the stone: sacred geography and cultural continuity. Economy among the Highland Maya of Guatemala." Estudios de cultura maya 45: 171–189. Mexico City, Mexico: Instituto de Investigaciones Filólogicas, Universidad Nacional Autónoma de México. ISSN 2448-5179.
Hart, Thomas (2008) The Ancient Spirituality of the Modern Maya. Albuquerque, New Mexico, US: University of New Mexico Press. . .
McDougall, Elsie (2011) [1946] "Observations on Altar Sites in the Quiche Region, Guatemala" Notes on Middle American Archaeology and Ethnology 62: 243–249. Boulder, Colorado, US: University Press of Colorado. 
Rodríguez Rouanet, Francisco; Edwin Soto; Fernando Seijas; Gerardo Townson Rincón (1993). Quiché. Colección Monografías de Guatemala 12 (in Spanish). Guatemala: Banco Granai & Townson, S.A. .
Span¡shD!ct. www.spanishdict.com. Curiosity Media. Retrieved 2017-12-01.
Ventura Peliz, Sebastiana Elizabeth (April 2007) El turismo en Guatemala; análisis económico jurídico y social del turismo en Santo Tomás Chichicastenango, departamento del Quiché. Guatemala City, Guatemala: Universidad de San Carlos de Guatemala: Facultad de Ciencias Jurídicas y Sociales. Retrieved 2017-12-03. Archived from the original on 2017-12-03.

External links

Chichicastenango
Maya art
Sculptures in Guatemala
K'iche'
Maya Contact Period
Vandalized works of art